The Melbourne Cricket Ground (MCG) is an Australian sports stadium located in Melbourne. It was established in 1854 and has a capacity of approximately 100,000. The MCG was the scene of the first ever Test match, which was played in 1877 between Australia and England. The ground also hosted the first One Day International (ODI), which took place in 1971 between Australia and England.

Charles Bannerman became the first Test centurion at the ground when he made 165 not out against England in 1877. Another Australian, Bob Cowper, holds the record for the highest individual Test score at the ground, Cowper made 307 against England in 1966. The highest individual score made by an overseas player is 244 not out, scored by Englishman Alastair Cook in 2017. Don Bradman has scored the most Test centuries at the ground with 9, while the most by an overseas player is 5, scored by Jack Hobbs.

The first ODI century scored at the MCG was in 1979 by the Englishman David Gower. His innings of 101 not out came from 100 balls. Englishman Jason Roy holds the record for the highest individual ODI score at the ground, with 180 from 151 balls, against Australia on 14 January 2018. Ricky Ponting has scored the most ODI centuries at the ground with 7.

Key
 * denotes that the batsman was not out.
 Inns. denotes the number of the innings in the match.
 Balls denotes the number of balls faced in an innings.
 NR denotes that the number of balls was not recorded.
 Parentheses next to the player's score denotes his century number at the Melbourne Cricket Ground.
 The column title Date refers to the date the match started.
 The column title Result refers to whether the player's team won, lost or if the match was drawn.

List of centuries

Test centuries
The following table summarises the Test centuries scored at the MCG.

One Day International centuries

The following table summarises the One Day International centuries scored at the MCG.

References 

Melbourne Cricket Ground
Melbourne
Cricket grounds in Australia
Australian cricket lists
Melbourne sport-related lists